The Four Lads was a Canadian male singing quartet which, in the 1950s, 1960s, and 1970s, earned many gold singles and albums. Its million-selling signature tunes include "Moments to Remember"; "Standing on the Corner"; "No, Not Much"; "Who Needs You?" and "Istanbul".

The Four Lads appeared on many television shows, including The Pat Boone Chevy Showroom (1958); Perry Como's show Perry Presents (1959); Frankie Laine Time (1956); and the award-winning PBS special, Moments to Remember: My Music.

The most recent incarnation of the group featured lead tenor Don Farrar, second tenor Aaron Bruce, baritone Alan Sokoloff, and bass singer Frank Busseri.

The original quartet grew up together in Toronto, Ontario, Canada, and were members of St. Michael's Choir School, where they learned to sing. The founding and core members were Corrado "Connie" Codarini, bass; John Bernard "Bernie" Toorish, tenor and vocal arranger; James F. "Jimmy" Arnold, lead; and Frank "Frankie" Busseri, baritone and group manager. Codarini and Toorish had formed a group with two other St. Michael's students, Rudi Maugeri and John Perkins, who were later to found The Crew-Cuts.

History
The group was known variously as 'The Otnorots' ("Toronto" spelled backwards) and 'The Jordonaires' (not to be confused with  The Jordanaires who sang background vocals on Elvis Presley's hits). When Maugeri and Perkins left the group to concentrate on their schoolwork, Codarini and Toorish joined with Arnold and Busseri in a new quartet. At home, they practiced until they achieved their clean-cut harmonies, whether for spirituals, sacred music, or pop. They originally called themselves “The Four Dukes”, but found out that a Detroit group already used that name, so they changed it to The Four Lads. In 1950, they began to sing in local clubs and soon were noticed by scouts. Recruited to go to New York, they were noticed there by Mitch Miller, the artists and repertoire man at Columbia Records, who asked them to sing backup for some of the artists he recorded. One of those artists, Johnnie Ray, became a major hit in 1951 with "Cry" and "The Little White Cloud That Cried", with the Four Lads backing him.

After the success of Ray’s first hit songs, the Four Lads signed a recording contract with Columbia. In early 1952, they recorded their first song, “Turn Back”, penned by group member Bernie Toorish under the name “Dazz Jordan”. Released by Columbia subsidiary Okeh Records (Okeh 6860), the song failed to make an impression. Sometime later that year, the group scored their first-ever hit record with "The Mocking Bird" (Okeh 6885), another Toorish composition. Based on a melody from the second movement of Antonin Dvorak’s Symphony No. 9 (known as the “New World Symphony”) and featuring an extremely limited accompaniment of percussion and bass, “The Mocking Bird” peaked at #23 on the Billboard pop charts. The Four Lads were quickly switched over to the Columbia label, where they continued to garner more hits, and stayed there until 1960.

In 1953, the Four Lads had their first gold record, with "Istanbul (Not Constantinople)", a song that gave them their first U.S. top-ten hit and propelled them to even more stardom.

The group’s most famous hit was 1955's "Moments to Remember",; another famous hit was "Standing on the Corner", from the Broadway musical production of The Most Happy Fella, in 1956. A gospel album with Frankie Laine took them back to their roots and produced the hit single "Rain, Rain, Rain", written by Toorish under the pseudonym “Jay McConologue”. The Four Lads’ Columbia recordings have seen releases and reissues on numerous studio albums and compilations over the years.

In late 1958, the group’s re-recording of “The Mocking Bird” became their last Top 40 pop hit. In 1959, their final pop chart appearance was with "Happy Anniversary", a song from the movie of the same name that peaked at #77. And when their Columbia contract expired in 1960, the group spent the rest of the 1960s recording for the Kapp, Dot and United Artists labels without ever hitting the charts again.

Codarini was replaced in 1962 by Johnny D'Arc (who remained with the Lads until 1982) and later fell into destitution. As Toorish once recalled, “[Connie] made a terrible mistake. [He] married a model. [She] drove him crazy. He was working in a restaurant for a while.” Toorish, who was burned out after twenty years of performing, was replaced by Sid Edwards in the early 1970s and became an insurance businessman. Arnold left the group in 1980 to become a voice teacher in Sacramento, California. Busseri remained with the group, and performed regularly with various members until late 2018.

Johnny D'Arc died in 1999, aged 60. Jimmy Arnold died in 2004, at the age of 72 in Sacramento, California.
Codarini died on April 28, 2010, in Concord, North Carolina, at the age of 80. Frank Busseri died in Rancho Mirage, California, on January 28, 2019, at age 86. Aaron Bruce (Aaron Bruce Grattidge), who was working as a radio DJ between performances, died in Topeka, Kansas in August 2020, age 79.

Awards and recognition
In 1984, the Four Lads were inducted into the Canadian Music Hall of Fame by the Canadian Academy of Recording Arts and Sciences (CARAS).  They were inducted into the Vocal Group Hall of Fame in 2003.

Gold singles
 "Istanbul (Not Constantinople)" (recorded August 12, 1953)
 "Moments to Remember" (recorded June 21, 1955)
 "No, Not Much" (recorded November 16, 1955)
 "Standing on the Corner" (recorded March 1, 1956)
 "Who Needs You?" (recorded October 18, 1956)

Singles discography

Studio and compilation albums 
Studio albums

Columbia Records
 The 4 Lads Stage Show (CL 6329, 1954)
 Frankie Laine and the Four Lads (with Frankie Laine) (CL 861)
 On the Sunny Side (with Claude Thornhill and his orchestra) (CL 912, 1956)
 The Four Lads Sing Frank Loesser (with Ray Ellis and his orchestra) (CL 1045, 1957)
 Four On The Aisle (CL 1111/CS 8047, 1958)
 Breezin' Along (CL 1223/CS 8035, 1958)
 Greatest Hits (CL 1235, 1958)
 Swing Along (CL 1299/CS 8106, 1959)
 High Spirits! (CL 1407/CS 8203, 1959)
 Love Affair (CL 1502/CS 8293, 1960)
 Everything Goes!!! (CL 1550/CS 8350, 1960)
Kapp Records
 12 Hits (KL 1224/KS 3224, 1961)
 Dixeland Doin's (KL 1254/KS 3254, 1961)
Dot Records
 Hits of the 1960's (DLP 3438/DLP 25438, 1962)
 Oh Happy Day (DLP 3533/DLP 25533, 1963)
United Artists Records
 This Year's Top Movie Songs (UAL 3356/UAS 6356, 1964)
 Songs of World War I (UAL 3399/UAS 6399, 1964)
Foma Records
 Ten Million & Still Counting (1977)

Select compilation albums of note
 16 Most Requested Songs (1991)
 That Great Gettin' Up Mornin''' (1995)
 Love Songs by the Four Lads (1997)
 Moments to Remember: The Very Best of the Four Lads (2000)
 The Singles Collection'' (2005)

See also

Canadian rock
Music of Canada

References

External links 
 The Four Lads home page

Canadian pop music groups
Canadian Music Hall of Fame inductees
Traditional pop music singers
Vocal quartets